Stylocidaris is a genus of echinoderms belonging to the family Cidaridae.

The genus has almost cosmopolitan distribution.

Species
Species:

Stylocidaris affinis 
Stylocidaris albidens 
Stylocidaris amboinae 
Stylocidaris annulosa 
Stylocidaris badia 
Stylocidaris bracteata 
Stylocidaris brevicollis 
Stylocidaris calacantha 
Stylocidaris chapmani 
Stylocidaris cingulata 
Stylocidaris conferta 
Stylocidaris effluens 
Stylocidaris laevispina 
Stylocidaris lineata 
Stylocidaris lorioli 
Stylocidaris maculosa 
Stylocidaris reini 
Stylocidaris rufa 
Stylocidaris ryukyuensis 
Stylocidaris tiara

References

Cidaridae
Cidaroida genera